The 1966 Big Ten Conference football season was the 71st season of college football played by the member schools of the Big Ten Conference and was a part of the 1966 NCAA University Division football season.

The 1966 Michigan State Spartans football team, under head coach Duffy Daugherty, won the Big Ten football championship, compiled a 9–0–1 record, and was ranked No. 2 in the final AP Poll. Four Spartans' players were among the first eight selections in the 1967 NFL/AFL Draft: defensive tackle Bubba Smith (first); running back Clinton Jones (second); linebacker George Webster (fifth); and flanker Gene Washington (eighth).

The 1966 Purdue Boilermakers football team, under head coach Jack Mollenkopf, finished in second place with a 9–2 record and was ranked No. 7 in the final AP Poll. The Boilermakers received the conference's berth to play in the 1967 Rose Bowl because of the Big Ten's "no-repeat" rule and defeated USC, 14–13. Purdue quarterback Bob Griese led the conference in passing yards and total yards and won the Chicago Tribune Silver Football as the Big Ten's most valuable player and the Sammy Baugh Trophy as the nation's top collegiate passer. Griese also finished second behind Steve Spurrier in the voting for the 1966 Heisman Trophy.

Season overview

Results and team statistics

Key
AP final = Team's rank in the final AP Poll of the 1966 season
AP high = Team's highest rank in the AP Poll throughout the 1966 season
PPG = Average of points scored per game
PAG = Average of points allowed per game
MVP = Most valuable player as voted by players on each team as part of the voting process to determine the winner of the Chicago Tribune Silver Football trophy; trophy winner in bold

Preseason

Regular season

Bowl games

Post-season developments

Statistical leaders

The Big Ten's individual statistical leaders for the 1966 season include the following:

Passing yards

Rushing yards

Receiving yards

Total yards

Scoring

Awards and honors

All-Big Ten honors

The following players were picked by the Associated Press (AP) and/or the United Press International (UPI) as first-team players on the 1966 All-Big Ten Conference football team.

Offense

Defense

All-American honors

At the end of the 1966 season, four Big Ten players secured consensus first-team honors on the 1966 College Football All-America Team. The Big Ten's consensus All-Americans were:

Other Big Ten players who were named first-team All-Americans by at least one selector were:

Other awards
Purdue quarterback Bob Griese received the Sammy Baugh Trophy as the nation's top collegiate passer. He also finished second in the voting for the Heisman Trophy.

1967 NFL/AFL Draft
The following Big Ten players were among the first 100 picks in the 1967 NFL/AFL Draft:

References